Barwon may refer to:
 Barwon, a horse which won the 1862 Victoria Derby
 Electoral district of Barwon, in the New South Wales Legislative Assembly, Australia
 HM Prison Barwon, a maximum security prison in Lara, Victoria, Australia
 HMAS Barwon (K406), a Royal Australian Navy River class frigate

See also
 Barwon River (disambiguation)
 Barwon Heads, Victoria, coastal township, Australia